Kon Kan is a Canadian synthpop project conceived and formed in 1988 by Barry Harris in Toronto, Ontario. Kon Kan were awarded a 1990 Juno for the song "I Beg Your Pardon" and nominated for a 1991 Juno Award for the single "Puss N' Boots/These Boots Are Made for Walkin'".

History

Band name
Musician Barry Harris said the name "Kon Kan" is a play on the term "Can Con", the Canadian radio regulation that states radio stations must play Canadian artists at least 30% of the time. Harris named the group "Kon Kan" as a subtle advertisement to Canadian stations that he was Canadian. However, he said the move didn't work, and he wasn't noticed by the stations until Atlantic Records signed them.

"I Beg Your Pardon"
"I Beg Your Pardon" was inspired in part by both the Pet Shop Boys hit single "Always on My Mind" and an increasingly prevalent use of sampling by artists such as Public Enemy, M/A/R/R/S and Coldcut. The track sampled Lynn Anderson's 1971 hit "(I Never Promised You a) Rose Garden", Silver Convention's 1976 hit "Get Up and Boogie (That's Right)", GQ's "Disco Nights (Rock-Freak)", Tones on Tail's "Go!", Spagna's "Call Me", National Lampoon'''s "Disco Hotline" sketch from their That's Not Funny, That's Sick album, and the opening bars from the theme music from The Magnificent Seven (which was also well known as the theme to a commercial for Marlboro cigarettes in the 1960s).

It was recorded part-time during weekends in a home basement midi studio in Hamilton, Ontario, in March, April and May 1988, which was where Harris met Kevin Wynne, who was hired to sing the song's verses.

The resulting single was released in June 1988 on (now defunct) indie label Revolving Records, in Toronto.

In a 1989 Billboard magazine interview, Harris reported it was a trip to Portugal that inspired him to write "I Beg Your Pardon", stating that he "got frustrated not getting anywhere as a DJ, so I went to Portugal to clear my mind. That's where the idea for 'Beg' came." The record was Harris' first studio project.

International success
Marc Nathan, a New York-based Atlantic Records employee (and radio promoter) who was on vacation in Toronto, heard "I Beg Your Pardon" in a dance club, where Barry Harris was DJing. Nathan bought several copies of the single from a record store around the corner from the club and took them back to New York. The single was sent to four radio stations and was received particularly enthusiastically in Houston.

By fall of 1988, Kon Kan were signed by Atlantic Records, and marketed as a duo. "I Beg Your Pardon", eventually re-released in the spring of 1989, was a worldwide hit, and reached the top 5 in several countries (including the UK) and the Billboard top 20 in the US. The song earned Kon Kan a Juno Award for Best Dance Recording in 1990.

Move to Move (1989)
Kon Kan's debut album, Move to Move, was recorded in Los Angeles in January and February 1989. Later that year it appeared on the RPM Top 100 Albums chart. As well as "I Beg Your Pardon", it also spawned the singles, "Harry Houdini", "Move to Move" and another original/cover combination, "Puss N' Boots". The latter track included recreations (rather than samples) of Led Zeppelin's "Immigrant Song" and Nancy Sinatra's "These Boots Are Made for Walkin'".

The album also featured collaborations with Bob Mitchell (who had co-written Cheap Trick's number one hit, "The Flame"), Jon Lind (co-writer of Madonna's "Crazy for You") and Dennis Matkosky. The album also featured a cover version of the smash hit "Bite the Bullet" by fellow Canadian group They Never Sleep.

The album was mixed by Alan Meyerson, who was later a film score mixer.

Kon Kan embarked on a world tour with backing vocalist Kim Esty and were particularly well received in South America and Asia.

Syntonic (1990)
Kevin Wynne, who sang on all but two tracks from Move to Move, left Kon Kan in 1989 and entered the club business. He is now involved in graphic design and print. Wynne also recorded a Depeche Mode-inspired solo single in the 1990s called "Last Chance", but it was not released.

Kon Kan, now effectively a solo vehicle for Barry Harris, released their second album, Syntonic late 1990.  Harris again teamed up with several writers (including Bob Mitchell), fusing dance and pop tracks with original songs such as Jimmy Soul's "If You Wanna Be Happy" (on "(Could've Said) I Told You So") and Canadian band Trooper's "We're Here for a Good Time" (on "Time"). The album was produced by a number of established producers, including renowned disco producer John Luongo, who had also worked with Blancmange, and Martyn Phillips (who had produced the Beloved's Happiness album that year). Paul Robb of Information Society also produced a couple of tracks.

The album was preluded by the single "Liberty", which featured vocals by Debbe Cole. At the time, Cole was a well established session vocalist, who is best known for her work on Malcolm McLaren's "Madam Butterfly". Cole also provided backing vocals on the subsequent "Syntonic" tour. Another single, "(Could've Said) I Told You So" was also released but, like the previous single and parent album, it was not a hit.

Vida!... (1993)
Following the commercial failure of Syntonic, Kon Kan was dropped from Atlantic Records' roster. Marc Nathan (who had been fired in April 1991 following an altercation with the record company's president) stayed loyal to Barry Harris and, in his new role with management company Between the Ears, helped to secure a new deal for Kon Kan with Hypnotic, a subsidiary of A&M Records.

For the next album, Vida!... (Hypnotic Records), Harris resumed songwriting duties with Bob Mitchell and Kon Kan expanded to a 4-piece band. Along with original songs such as the album's lead single "Sinful Wishes", there was a remake of "Move to Move" and a cover of David Bowie's "Moonage Daydream". The second single released from the album was "S.O.L." (short for "shit outta luck"), a collaboration with Crash Morgan.

The album, released only in Canada, failed to regain Kon Kan's earlier success and Harris wound up the Kon Kan brand over the next few years.

In 1994, Harris re-recorded "I Beg Your Pardon" without any samples and re-recorded all the vocals. It was released as an EP double pack 12" with various remixes on Hi-Bias Records in early 1994.

Post-Kon Kan projects
In 1994, Barry Harris teamed up with fellow DJ and Canadian compatriot, Terry Kelly, and formed the house music project, Top Kat. They released a series of independent singles (on the Stickman label) and one album, Hi-Energy House on the Hypnotic label. The album featured revisits of Kon Kan's "I Beg Your Pardon" ("Pardon Me/Rose Garden"), "Liberty" ("There's a Voice in My Heart") and "S.O.L." ("Come Unto Me...Sing").

Barry Harris then collaborated with Rachid Wehbi in the Eurodance band Outta Control, featuring the vocals of Kimberley Wetmore. They released a self-titled album in 1996 which featured versions of Kon Kan's "Sinful Wishes" and Joan Osborne's "One of Us". The album also featured a version of Giorgio Moroder and Philip Oakey's "Together in Electric Dreams" sung by Barry Harris (but credited to guest vocals by Kon Kan).

In 1997, Barry Harris recorded a one-off single, "I Can't Take the Heartbreak" with Rachid Wehbi, under the name Killer Bunnies.

Harris gained his greatest post-Kon Kan popularity as one half of Thunderpuss (named Thunderpuss 2000 from 1997 to 1999), collaborating with producer, remixer and DJ, Chris Cox. Cox had worked with Harris on the Outta Control album. Together they produced and remixed dozens of dance hits for many major music artists in the late 1990s and early 2000s, most notably "It's Not Right but It's Okay" by Whitney Houston. The duo also concurrently released material under the Thunderpuss moniker, such as covers of "Papa's Got a Brand New Pigbag" and David Bowie's "Heroes".

Harris also continued to release singles in his own name, such as "Why'd Ya Let Her" and the tribal dance anthem, "Dive in the Pool".

Two Thunderpuss albums were released, Dancemania 20 (2001) and Thunderpuss (2002), while Harris has released a couple of "continuous mix" albums, as part of 4-Play's Circuit Session series. Volume 3 (released in 2000) included the single "Beg for It", another reprisal of Kon Kan's "I Beg Your Pardon".

Concurrent to his remixing activities, Harris also resumed his DJing career, securing regular employment in clubs in New York, Los Angeles, San Francisco and other major cities. He was also a popular draw at various circuit parties around the world, and particularly successful on a Japanese tour in 2000.

Following a solo remix for Chaka Khan, Harris took a break from the music industry. Following a four-year hiatus he re-emerged in 2009 with "Drama Queen (Texting You)", a collaboration with Simone Denny whom he'd worked with in the 1990s.

In 2011, Harris formed Sick Seconds, a rock band featuring Anton Cook (who had provided drums on Kon Kan's Vida!... album) and other local musicians. They released their self-titled debut album via iTunes in March 2013.

Reformation
In June 2013, Barry Harris and Kevin Wynne reunited as Kon Kan.

On 25 March 2014, Harris announced on Kon Kan's Facebook Page that they were to begin writing and producing a new Kon Kan song with Rachid Wehbi.

On 16 May 2022, Harris posted a letter to Kon Kan's Facebook Page to announce that he will not be performing as part of the band for the Lost 80's Live U.S. tour, and that he allowed Wynne to use the Kon Kan name for the said tour. He also said that there will not be any new Kon Kan music. Also performing as part of the band is Sandy Horne of Spoons.

Kon Kan discography
Albums
 Move to Move (1989)
 Syntonic (1990)  
 Vida!...'' (1993)

Singles

References

External links

Atlantic Records artists
Canadian electronic music groups
Canadian dance music groups
Canadian musical duos
Canadian synthpop groups
Canadian hi-NRG groups
Hypnotic Records artists
Juno Award for Dance Recording of the Year winners
Musical groups established in 1988
Musical groups disestablished in 1994
Musical groups reestablished in 2013
Musical groups from Toronto
Electronic music duos
Male musical duos
1988 establishments in Ontario
1994 disestablishments in Ontario